Mark Robert "Buck" Miles (December 10, 1888 – June 21, 1954) was a professional football player who played for the Cleveland Tigers in 1919 and for the Akron Pros of the American Professional Football Association in 1920. Miles won an APFA-NFL title in 1920 with the Pros. He played college football and basketball at Washington and Lee University.

References

1888 births
Akron Pros players
Washington and Lee Generals football players
Sportspeople from Brooklyn
Players of American football from New York City
1954 deaths
Erasmus Hall High School alumni